Eressa lepcha is a moth of the family Erebidae. It was described by Frederic Moore in 1879. It is found in Sikkim, India.

References

Eressa
Moths described in 1879